Kamen Goranov (born 7 June 1948) is a Bulgarian former wrestler who competed in the 1976 Summer Olympics.

References

1948 births
Living people
Olympic wrestlers of Bulgaria
Wrestlers at the 1976 Summer Olympics
Bulgarian male sport wrestlers
Olympic silver medalists for Bulgaria
Olympic medalists in wrestling
People from Montana, Bulgaria
Medalists at the 1976 Summer Olympics
20th-century Bulgarian people
21st-century Bulgarian people